Aullwood House and Garden is a registered historic site near Dayton, Ohio, listed in the National Register on 1999-02-05.

The property once served as home for Dayton-area industrialist John Aull and his wife, Marie.  Today, the garden is one of twenty-five properties cared for by Five Rivers MetroParks. There are guided tours of the   gardens.

References

External links

 Aullwood Garden MetroPark - official site

National Register of Historic Places in Montgomery County, Ohio
Houses on the National Register of Historic Places in Ohio
Houses in Montgomery County, Ohio
Protected areas of Montgomery County, Ohio
Tourist attractions in Montgomery County, Ohio
Parks in Ohio
Gardens in Ohio
Parks on the National Register of Historic Places in Ohio